O Yeong-su, O Yeong-soo, O Young-su, O Young-soo, Oh Yeong-soo, Oh Yeong-su, Oh Young-soo or Oh Young-su is the name of:

 O Yeong-su (writer) (1909–1979), South Korean writer
 O Yeong-su (actor) (born 1944), South Korean actor